Social Education is a peer-reviewed academic journal covering social studies education in the United States. It is published by the National Council for the Social Studies.

According to Marsela (2014), the problem of social exclusion, which is directly related to the problems of social education as well, was revealed as the one that is associated with the problems of maintaining social order and stability.

History
The National Council for the Social Studies's first president, Albert Edward McKinley (1870-1936), also served as the journal's publisher and managing editor. The publication was establishedted in 1930 as Historical Outlook. In 1937 it became the official journal of the council, obtaining its current name.

Abstracting and indexing
The journal is abstracted and indexed in EBSCO databases and the Modern Language Association Database.

References

External links

Further reading

English-language journals
Publications established in 1930
Education journals